Angelbreen (Fish Hook Glacier) is a glacier in Andrée Land at Spitsbergen, Svalbard. It is located between Skuggefjellet and Skirshorg, at the western side of Vestfjorddalen. The shape of the glacier resembles a fish hook.

References

Glaciers of Spitsbergen